Twist is a 2021 British crime drama film directed by Martin Owen and co-produced by Noel Clarke and Jason Maza, who also stars in the film. The film, an adaptation of Charles Dickens' 1838 novel Oliver Twist, stars Rafferty Law, Michael Caine, Noel Clarke, Lena Headey, Rita Ora and Sophie Simnett. Twist was released on Sky Cinema on 29 January 2021 and was met with negative reception from critics.

Plot
A thief named Tom steals an envelope from a safe and escapes from guards, but is thrown off a building by an unseen assailant. The envelope is stolen while Tom is left to die.

Years before, a boy named Oliver lived with his mother Molly and their hobby was painting. After Molly dies from unknown causes, Oliver runs away scared due to not knowing anyone else. He teaches himself to free run and gets the nickname "Twist". One day while graffiti spraying on a traffic warden's van, the police chase him and he meets Dodge and Batesey (The Artful Dodger and Charles Bates). They escape to their den near the Truman Brewery where Twist meets Fagin, their carer. The next morning, Twist draws a giant graffiti painting on a building. Fagin sends Red (Nancy Lee) to invite Twist (who is smitten with her) to his for dinner. Meanwhile, Fagin meets with a friend of his named Sikes (Bill Sikes) revealing she pushed Chitling. Twist stays with the family and Fagin reveals his plan to steal from art dealer Dr. Crispin Losberne who took everything from Fagin. They then steal his phone and Batesey makes a copy. Meanwhile, Red, as a distraction, asks to be an intern for Losberne, so the next day Fagin gets the blueprints to Losberne's gallery. Twist meets Sikes and her dog Bull's-Eye. Fagin explains that Losberne once went into partnership with a Mr. Issac Solomon who Losberne also betrayed.

Red plants a small bomb in Losberne's bathroom to steal a lost painting by William Hogarth. The bomb floods the basement and causes the painting to have to be moved. Back at base, Twist finds out that Red and Sikes are a couple upsetting him. At a pub, Red appears and Sikes’ goons attack the group while Dodge plays Ever Fallen In Love in the jukebox. Twist and Red escape to a pool where the two kiss and run through the park. Twist is arrested by the traffic warden from earlier and is interrogated by Detectives Brownlow and Bedwin who tell him about Chitling. Twist is let free and gets back to base. Batesey is planning to get in a box to steal the painting while it's on the move but because he's claustrophobic, Twist switches places with him.

Losberne finds out about the thieves and this causes Twist to fall out the van. Sikes picks Batesey up and apparently kills him. Twist gets back to base and asks "What happened to Tom Chitling?" and Sikes reveals that she killed Tom. Fagin makes a plan to break into the auction building. Disguised, the group sneak in and Fagin plants a gun in Losberne's chair. This causes a big evacuation. Twist steals the painting and escapes with Dodge. Batesey, who is still alive, reveals that Sikes tried to kill him and meets them at the base where Twist reveals he made a duplicate of the painting and has hidden the real one. He and Red escape and Sikes shoots Fagin. She then chases them to a rooftop and is shot by Fagin and falls off the building.

A week later, Twist meets Bedwin and Brownlow at a café and leaves them the envelope and a key. He then calls Brownlow hinting that the painting was right next to them the whole time. The envelope reveals the true owners of the painting and the key leads them to a locker owned by Losberne (who is arrested) which houses many stolen artwork. Fagin is revealed to be Issac Solomon and leaves the gang. It’s also revealed that when Twist was in the van, he snuck a painting by his mother and it goes on display at the National Gallery.

The film ends with Twist telling the gang to stop stealing and start selling paintings while he and Red start a relationship.

Cast
 Rafferty Law as Oliver Twist
 Michael Caine as Issac "Fagin" Solomon
 Lena Headey as Sikes
 Rita Ora as Dodge
 Noel Clarke as Brownlow
 Franz Drameh as Batesey
 Sophie Simnett as Nancy "Red" Lee
 David Walliams as Dr. Crispin Losberne
 Jason Maza as Bedwin
 Dominic Di Tommaso as Tom Chitling
 Leigh Francis as Warden Bumble
 Nick Nevern as Ron

Production
It was announced in October 2019 that a new take on the Charles Dickens novel had begun filming, with Raff Law cast to play the titular Twist. Michael Caine was cast as Fagin, with Lena Headey and Rita Ora cast as female renditions of Bill Sikes and Artful Dodger, respectively. David Walliams, Franz Drameh and Sophie Simnett were also cast.

The film was produced by Pure Grass Films, along with Unstoppable Film and Television, and First Access Entertainment Film and Television. The UK-based company Koala FX was responsible for the digital make up and advance clean up.

Music 

Ora wrote a song for the film entitled “Flame”. The soundtrack was composed by Neil Athale and produced by Tom Linden who also wrote a song for the film (credited as TL) alongside Laura Greaves entitled “Get Back Up”.

Release
Sky Cinema distributed the film within the United Kingdom, with Saban Films distributing within North America. Originally, the film was set for a 2020 release. However, the film was pushed to 2021. It was released on 29 January. The Vaccines’ unreleased song Wanderlust from their 5th LP Back In Love City was played during the trailer.

Novel
Tom Grass at Pure Grass Films released a novelisation based on the film but has more adult content.

Reception
On Rotten Tomatoes, it has a 9% score, based on 34 reviews, with an average rating of 3.40/10. Its critic consensus reads, "The real Twist in this lunkheaded Dickens update is the involvement of Michael Caine, who hopefully got another terrific house out of it." Peter Bradshaw of The Guardian gave it two stars out of five, saying that 'the action and comedy are under par'. Clarisse Loughrey of The Independent gave it one out of five stars, writing, 'With its hectic pace and textbook needle drops – The Fratellis' "Chelsea Dagger" makes an appearance – Twist never really functions as much more than another Guy Ritchie homage.'

Accolades

References

External links
 
 

2021 films
2021 crime drama films
2021 LGBT-related films
British crime drama films
British LGBT-related films
Films based on Oliver Twist
Films set in London
Hood films
Films shot in London
Lesbian-related films
LGBT-related drama films
Oliver Twist
2020s English-language films
2020s British films